Gustavo Fernández defeated Nicolas Peifer in the final, 3–6, 6–2, 6–0 to win the men's singles wheelchair tennis title at the 2017 Australian Open. It was his first Australian Open singles title and second major singles title overall.

Gordon Reid was the defending champion, but was defeated in the quarterfinals by Joachim Gérard.

Seeds

Draw

Draw

References 

General

 Drawsheets on ausopen.com 

Specific

Wheelchair Men's Singles
2017 Men's Singles